Whitesaddle Mountain is a summit located in British Columbia, Canada.

Description

Whitesaddle ranks as the ninth-highest peak in the Niut Range. Precipitation runoff and glacier meltwater from the mountain drains into tributaries of Mosley Creek, thence Homathko River and ultimately Bute Inlet. Topographic relief is significant as the summit rises nearly 2,200 meters (7,218 feet) above Middle Lake in six kilometers (3.7 miles).

History

The Whitesaddle name was submitted for consideration in April 1933 by Henry Snow Hall (1895–1987), Harvard Mountaineering Club, following his first ascent of nearby Blackhorn Mountain in 1932. Hall wrote: "I have suggested the names Whitesaddle and Blackhorn for the two peaks which are prominently visible down the Homathko valley from the automobile road passing Tatla Lake. The names seem appropriate for this cattle ranching country because of the appearance of the peaks themselves. The right hand peak of the two, a dark rock dome, has a white glacier flowing from the summit down the face of the peak toward the observer which reminded me at once of a white saddle." The landform's toponym was officially adopted January 9, 1934, by the Geographical Names Board of Canada.

The first ascent of Whitesaddle's summit was made in 1939 by Henry Snow Hall and Hans Fuhrer. In July 1985, Fred Beckey and Reed Tindall were the first to climb the north face.

Climate

Based on the Köppen climate classification, Whitesaddle Mountain is located in the marine west coast climate zone of western North America. Most weather fronts originate in the Pacific Ocean, and travel east toward the Coast Mountains where they are forced upward by the range (Orographic lift), causing them to drop their moisture in the form of rain or snowfall. As a result, the Coast Mountains experience high precipitation, especially during the winter months in the form of snowfall. Winter temperatures can drop below −20 °C with wind chill factors below −30 °C.

See also
 
 Geography of British Columbia

References

External links
 Weather forecast: Whitesaddle Mountain
 Henry Snow Hall in memoriam: Americanalpineclub.org

Pacific Ranges
Two-thousanders of British Columbia
Range 2 Coast Land District
Coast Mountains